A scalpel is a surgical instrument used for cutting.

Scalpel may also refer to:

 SCALPEL,  a laser-guided bomb produced by Lockheed Martin
 The Scalpel, a commercial skyscraper in London, United Kingdom
 Scalpel (film), a 1977 American thriller film
 Laser scalpel, a scalpel which uses a laser, not a blade, for cutting
 SS-24 Scalpel, an intercontinental ballistic missile
 Scalpel, a character in the Transformers film series
 "Scalpel", a song by Alice In Chains from The Devil Put Dinosaurs Here